The 1978–79 Drexel Dragons men's basketball team represented Drexel University during the 1978–79 men's basketball season. The Dragons, led by 2nd year head coach Eddie Burke, played their home games at the Daskalakis Athletic Center and were members of the East Coast Conference (ECC).

The team finished the season 18–9, and finished in 5th place in the ECC East in the regular season.

Roster

Schedule

|-
!colspan=9 style="background:#F8B800; color:#002663;"| Regular season
|-

|-
!colspan=12 style="background:#FFC600; color:#07294D;"| ECC Tournament
|-

Awards
Randy Burkert
ECC Rookie of the Year

Bob Stephens
ECC All-Conference First Team
ECC Player of the Week (4)
Lafayette College Invitational Tournament MVP
Lafayette College Invitational All-Tournament Team

References

Drexel Dragons men's basketball seasons
Drexel
1978 in sports in Pennsylvania
1979 in sports in Pennsylvania